Elsy del Pilar Cuello Calderón (born in Bogotá, 13 June 1959) is a Supreme Court Judge from the Corte Suprema de Justicia of Colombia.

Elsy del Pilar Cuello Calderón is a lawyer graduated from the Universidad Santo Tomás in Bogotá, Colombia. Since 1990 she's been a Court Judge. She's part of Labor Cassation Chamber of the Supreme Court of Colombia. Mrs. Cuello is also part of the National Commission  of Gender for the judicial Branch (Comisión Nacional de Género de la Rama Judicial),  which was created in February 2008 this commission determines the rules for gender equity in the judicial branch of Colombia.

Elsy del Pilar Cuello has been elected twice as Supreme Court Judge of Colombia. The first time in June 2004 for a three months period and later on June 5, 2007, for the regular term of 8 years period.

References 
 El 21% de los magistrados de las altas Cortes son mujeres
     El Presidente de la República, Álvaro Uribe Vélez, posesionó a Elsy Del Pilar Cuello
Tomó posesión, este martes en la Casa de Nariño, Elsy del Pilar Cuello Calderón
 Versión en español

Magistrates of the Supreme Court of Justice of Colombia
Living people
1959 births